Robben Island is an island in Table Bay, 6.9 kilometres (4.3 mi) west of the coast of Bloubergstrand, north of Cape Town, South Africa. It takes its name from the Dutch word for seals (robben), hence the Dutch/Afrikaans name Robbeneiland, which translates to Seal(s) Island.

It is flat and only a few metres above sea level, as a result of an ancient erosion event. It was fortified and used as a prison from the late-seventeenth century until 1996, after the end of apartheid.

Political activist and lawyer Nelson Mandela was imprisoned on the island for 18 of the 27 years of his imprisonment before the fall of apartheid and introduction of full, multi-racial democracy. He was later awarded the Nobel Peace Prize and was elected in 1994 as President of South Africa, becoming the country's first black president and serving one term from 1994–1999. In addition, the majority of prisoners were detained here for political reasons. Two other former inmates of Robben Island, in addition to Mandela, have been elected to the presidency since the late-1990s: Kgalema Motlanthe (2008–2009) and Jacob Zuma (2009–2018).

Robben Island is a South African National Heritage Site as well as a UNESCO World Heritage Site.

History

Located at the entrance to Table Bay, 11 km from Cape Town, this island, was discovered by Bartolomeu Dias in 1488 and, for many years, it was used by Portuguese navigators, later by English and Dutch as a refueling station.  Its current name means “seal island”, in Dutch.

In 1654, the settlers of the Dutch Cape Colony placed all of their ewes and a few rams on Robben Island, and the men built a large shed and a shelter. The isolation offered better protection against wild animals than on the mainland. The settlers also collected seal skins and boiled oil to supply the needs of the settlement.

Since the end of the 17th century, Robben Island has been used for the incarceration of chiefly political prisoners. The Dutch settlers were the first to use Robben Island as a prison. The island's first prisoner was probably Autshumato in the mid-17th century. Among its early permanent inhabitants were political leaders imprisoned from other Dutch colonies, including the Dutch East Indies, and the leader of the mutiny on the slave ship Meermin.

After the British Royal Navy captured several Dutch East Indiamen at the battle of Saldanha Bay in the Fourth Anglo-Dutch War in 1781, a boat rowed out to meet the British warships. On board were the "kings of Ternate and Tidore, and the princes of the respective families". The Dutch had long held them on "Isle Robin", but then had moved them to Saldanha Bay.

In 1806, the Scottish whaler John Murray opened a whaling station at a sheltered bay on the north-eastern shore of the island, which became known as Murray's Bay. It was adjacent to the site of the present-day harbour named Murray's Bay Harbour, which was constructed in 1939–40.

After a failed uprising at Grahamstown in 1819, the fifth of the Xhosa Wars, the British colonial government sentenced African leader Makanda Nxele to life imprisonment on the island. He drowned on the shores of Table Bay after escaping the prison.

The island was also used as a leper colony and animal quarantine station. Starting in 1845, lepers from the Hemel-en-Aarde (heaven and earth) leper colony near Caledon were moved to Robben Island when Hemel-en-Aarde was found unsuitable as a leper colony. Initially, this was done on a voluntary basis, and the lepers were free to leave the island if they so wished. In April 1891, the cornerstones for 11 new buildings to house lepers were laid. After passage of the Leprosy Repression Act in May 1892, admission was no longer voluntary, and the movement of the lepers was restricted. Doctors and scientists did not understand the disease and thought that isolation was the only way to prevent other people from contracting it. Prior to 1892, an average of about 25 lepers a year were admitted to Robben Island, but in 1892 that number rose to 338, and a further 250 were admitted in 1893.

During the Second World War, the island was fortified. BL 9.2-inch guns and 6-inch guns were installed as part of the defences for Cape Town.

From 1961, Robben Island was used by the South African government as a prison for political prisoners and convicted criminals. In 1969, the Moturu Kramat, now a sacred site for Muslim pilgrimage on Robben Island, was built to commemorate Sayed Abdurahman Moturu, the Prince of Madura. Moturu, one of Cape Town's first imams, had been exiled in the mid-1740s to the island. He died there in 1754. Muslim political prisoners would pay homage at the shrine before leaving the island.

In 1982, former inmate Indres Naidoo's book "Island in Chains" became the first published account of prison life on the island.

The maximum security prison for political prisoners closed in 1991. The medium security prison for criminal prisoners was closed five years later.

With the end of apartheid, the island has become a popular tourist destination. It is managed by Robben Island Museum (RIM); which operates the site as a living museum. In 1999, the island was declared a World Heritage Site for its importance to South Africa's political history and development of a democratic society. Every year, thousands of visitors take the ferry from the Victoria & Alfred Waterfront in Cape Town for tours of the island and its former prison. Many of the guides are former prisoners. All land on the island is owned by the nation of South Africa, with the exception of the island church. Administratively, Robben Island is a suburb of the City of Cape Town. It is open all year around, weather permitting.

Access to the island
Robben Island is accessible to visitors through tours that depart from Cape Town's waterfront. Tours depart three times a day and take about 3.5 hours, consisting of a ferry trip to and from the island, and a tour of the various historical sites on the island that form part of the Robben Island Museum. These include the island graveyard,the disused lime quarry, Robert Sobukwe's house, the Bluestone quarry, the army and navy bunkers, and the maximum security prison. Nelson Mandela's cell is shown.

Maritime hazard

Seagoing vessels must take great care navigating near Robben Island and nearby Whale Rock (it does not break the surface) as these pose a danger to shipping. A prevailing rough Atlantic swell surrounds the offshore reefs and the island's jagged coastline. Stricken vessels driven onto rocks are quickly broken up by the powerful surf. A total of 31 vessels are known to have been wrecked around the island.

In 1990, a marine archaeology team from the University of Cape Town began Operation "Sea Eagle". It was an underwater survey that scanned  of seabed around Robben Island. The task was made particularly difficult by the strong currents and high waves of these waters. The group found 24 vessels that had sunk around Robben Island. The team concluded that poor weather, darkness and fog were the cause of the sinkings.
 
Maritime wrecks around Robben Island and its surrounding waters include the 17th-century Dutch East Indiaman ships, the Yeanger van Horne (1611), the Shaapejacht (1660), and the Dageraad (1694). Later 19th-century wrecks include several British brigs, including the Gondolier (1836), and the United States clipper, A.H. Stevens (1866). In 1901 the mail steamer SS Tantallon Castle struck rocks off Robben Island in dense fog shortly after leaving Cape Town. After distress cannons were fired from the island, nearby vessels rushed to the rescue. All 120 passengers and crew were taken off the ship before it was broken apart in the relentless swell. A further 17 ships have been wrecked in the 20th century, including British, Spanish, Norwegian and Taiwanese vessels.

Robben Island lighthouse

Due to the maritime danger of Robben Island and its near waters, Jan van Riebeeck, the first Dutch colonial administrator in Cape Town in the 1650s, ordered that huge bonfires were to be lit at night on top of Fire Hill, the highest point on the island (now Minto Hill). These were to warn VOC ships that they were approaching the island.

In 1865, Robben Island lighthouse was completed on Minto Hill. In 1938, the lamp was converted to electricity. The lighthouse uses a flashing lantern instead of a revolving lamp; it shines for a duration of 5 seconds every seven seconds. A secondary red light acts as a navigation aid for vessels sailing south-southeast.

Wildlife and conservation 

When the Dutch arrived in the area in 1652, the only large animals on the island were seals and birds, principally penguins. In 1654, the settlers released rabbits on the island to provide a ready source of meat for passing ships.

The original colony of African penguins on the island was completely exterminated by 1800. But, since 1983, a new colony has been established there, and the modern island is again an important breeding area for the species. The colony grew to a size of ~16,000 individuals in 2004, before starting to decline in size again. , this decline has been continuous (to a colony size of ~3,000 individuals). Such a decline has been found at almost all other African penguin colonies. Its causes are still largely unclear and likely to vary between colonies, but at Robben Island are probably related to a diminishing of the food supply (sardines and anchovies) through competition by fisheries. Easy to see in their natural habitat, the penguins have been a popular tourist attraction.

Around 1958, Lieutenant Peter Klerck, a South African Navy officer serving on the island, introduced various animals. The following extract of an article, written by his son Michael Klerck, who lived on the island from an early age, describes the local fauna:

My father, a naval officer at the time, with the sanction of Doctor Hey, director of Nature Conservation, turned an area into a nature reserve. A 'Noah's Ark' berthed in the harbour sometime in 1958. They stocked the island with tortoise, duck, geese, buck (which included Springbok, Eland, Steenbok, Bontebok and Fallow Deer), Ostrich and a few Wildebeest which did not last long. All except the fallow deer are indigenous to the Cape. Many animals are still there including three species of tortoise—the most recently discovered in 1998—two Parrot Beaked specimens that have remained undetected until now. The leopard or mountain tortoises might have suspected the past terror; perhaps they had no intention of being a part of a future infamy, but they often attempted the swim back to the mainland (they are the only species in the world that can swim). Boats would lift them out of the sea in Table Bay and return them to us. None of the original 12 shipped over remain, and in 1995, four more were introduced—they seem to have more easily accepted their home as they are still residents. One resident brought across a large leopard tortoise discovered in a friend's garden in Newlands, Cape Town. He lived in our garden and grew big enough to climb over the wall and roam the island much like the sheep in Van Riebeeck's time. As children we were able to ride his great frame comfortably, as did some grown men. The buck and ostriches seemed equally happy and the ducks and Egyptian Geese were assigned a home in the old quarry, which had, some three hundred years before, supplied the dressed stone for the foundations of the Castle; at the time of my residence it bristled with fish.

Recent reports in Cape Town newspapers show that a lack of upkeep, a lack of culling, and the proliferation of rabbits on the island has led to the total devastation of the wildlife; there remains today almost none of the animals my father brought over all those years ago; the rabbits themselves have laid the island waste, stripping it of almost all ground vegetation. It looks almost like a desert. A reporter from the broadcasting corporation told me recently that they found the carcass of the last Bontebok.

In the early 21st century, the rabbit population had reached an estimated 25,000, which had become an invasive species, endangering others. Humans are hunting and culling the rabbits to reduce their number.

Climate change

In 2022, the IPCC Sixth Assessment Report included Robben Island in the list of African cultural sites which would be threatened by flooding and coastal erosion by the end of the century, but only if climate change followed RCP 8.5, which is the scenario of high and continually increasing greenhouse gas emissions associated with the warming of over 4°C., and is no longer considered very likely. The other, more plausible scenarios result in lower warming levels and consequently lower sea level rise: yet, sea levels would continue to increase for about 10,000 years under all of them. Even if the warming is limited to 1.5°C, global sea level rise is still expected to exceed  after 2000 years (and higher warming levels will see larger increases by then), consequently exceeding 2100 levels of sea level rise under RCP 8.5 (~ with a range of ) well before the year 4000.

Gallery

See also 

1620 Robben Island earthquake
List of World Heritage Sites in South Africa
List of heritage sites near Cape Town

References

Further reading

External links

 Robben Island Museum
 Robben Island – UNESCO World Heritage Centre
 Robben Island Museum at Google Cultural Institute

 
Nature reserves
South African heritage sites
World Heritage Sites in South Africa
Suburbs of Cape Town
Nelson Mandela
Prison islands
Atlantic islands of South Africa
Tourist attractions in Cape Town
Penguin colonies